Crambus lathoniellus is a species of moth of the family Crambidae described by Johann Leopold Theodor Friedrich Zincken in 1817. It is found in Europe, Central and South-East Asia.

In this Crambus a white longitudinal stripe emanates From the wing base ending sharply at an obliquely running dark line. In some specimens a white spot is formed in continuation and up to the submarginal line. The longitudinal strip has behind the center (seen from the base), closer to the submarginal line a "tooth" facing outwards and to the inner edge.

The moth flies from May to September depending on the location.

The larvae feed on various grasses.

Subspecies
Crambus lathoniellus lathoniellus (Europe, Asia Minor, Transcaucasus to Central Asia to Amur)
Crambus lathoniellus alfacarellus Staudinger, 1859 (Spain) 
Crambus lathoniellus altivolens Schawerda, 1913 (Yugoslavia)

References

External links
 Crambus lathoniellus. UKMoths.

Crambini
Moths described in 1817
Moths of Europe
Moths of Asia